Phurbi Chyachu (also known as Phurbi Chhyachu and Purbi Gyachu) is a mountain peak in the Himalayas on the border of Nepal and the Tibet Autonomous Region.

Location 

Climbing history 

The first ascent was made on May 1, 1982, by a Japanese expedition consisting of Shintaro Kurokawa, Fumihito Ogawa, Hiromitsu Okamoto, Takashi Shingaki, Hajime Takigami, Ang Phuri Lama, and Pemba Lama Sherpa.

References 

Mountains of the Himalayas
Wikipedia requested photographs by location
Mountains of Nepal
Six-thousanders of China